Baltimore Whore may refer to:

 B-26 Marauder bomber aircraft
 "Baltimore Whores", song on first disk of compilation album Rogue's Gallery: Pirate Ballads, Sea_Songs, and Chanteys